The Lost River Range is a high mountain range of the Rocky Mountains, located in Central Idaho, in the Northwestern United States.

To the west are the valleys of the Salmon and the Big Lost Rivers, while to the east are the Little Lost River and Pashimeroi Valleys.

It quickly rises to Grouse Creek Mountain (11,085 ft, 3,378 m) and Dickey Peak (11,141 ft, 3,395 m), and then descends to Double Springs Pass, location of one of just two roads to cross the range. Nearby is an interpretive site explaining the effects of the magnitude 6.9 Borah Peak earthquake that hit the range on October 28, 1983. The Big Lost River Valley fell and the Lost River Range rose, leaving a fault scarp of up to  along the base of the mountains.

The range then rises into its high central section, which includes many of the state's highest peaks. Further south are Mount Idaho (12,065 ft, 3,677 m), Leatherman Peak (12,228 ft, 3,727 m), Mount Church (over 12,200 ft, 3,720 m), Mount Breitenbach (12,140 ft, 3,700 m), and Lost River Mountain (12,078 ft, 3,681 m). To the east of this section of the range lie the remote canyons of the Upper Pashimeroi Valley, including scenic Merriam Lake.

The range then descends to Pass Creek Summit, the second road to cross its crest. It continues to King Mountain (10,612 ft, 3,235 m), a favorite site for hang gliders.

Peaks

References

External links

  SummitPost.org: Lost River Range
 

Ranges of the Rocky Mountains
Mountain ranges of Idaho
Landforms of Custer County, Idaho
Landforms of Butte County, Idaho
Salmon-Challis National Forest